Murray Garretty (19 May 1938 – 16 May 1981) was an Australian swimmer. He competed in two events at the 1956 Summer Olympics.

References

External links
 

1938 births
1981 deaths
Australian male freestyle swimmers
Olympic swimmers of Australia
Swimmers at the 1956 Summer Olympics
Place of birth missing